Major John Elsdale Molson TD (1863–1925) was a Canadian-born British Conservative politician and member of the Molson family of Montreal that started the famous Molson brewery.

John Molson was the son of Samuel Elsdale and Agnes Molson, born in Montreal on 6 August 1863. Educated at Cheltenham College and Emmanuel College, Cambridge, he qualified from the Middlesex Hospital Medical School in 1889. The Medical Register for 1891 listed him as employed at the Middlesex Hospital in London having registered as a doctor on 19 September 1889.

He held a commission in the Royal Army Medical Corps (Territorials) from 1900 and served at home and in Egypt in World War I.

He practised for some years at Chelmsford. From 1906 he rented Goring Hall, Goring-by-Sea near Worthing, in Sussex and lived the life of a country gentleman. He died on 28 November 1925, aged 62, and his funeral was held at St Mary's Church, Goring on 2 December 1925.

He was the Unionist Member of Parliament  for Gainsborough, Lincolnshire from 1918 to 1923, having unsuccessfully contested Bethnal Green North East in the two 1910 general elections. On 22 November 1920 Irish Nationalist MP Joseph Devlin raised the Croke Park massacre the previous day, causing uproar. Devlin continued to try to put his question and was assaulted by Molson who pulled him over the bench. The Speaker suspended the sitting for 15 minutes; when it resumed, Molson apologised and Devlin was able to ask his questions and to get an answer. He lost his seat to the Liberal Sir Richard Winfrey in the 1923 general election.

Family
He married Mary Leeson in 1891 in London. She had been born in Argentina, the daughter of Dr Arthur Edmund Leeson, and christened at St John's Cathedral in Buenos Aires on 16 June 1863.

His three other sons died in military service: Harold Elsdale Molson died on 5 February 1946 as a major in Princess Patricia's Canadian Light Infantry, Eric Elsdale Molson was killed in action on Good Friday, 1 April 1915 as a lieutenant in the Royal Scots (Lothian Regiment), and Gerald Hildred Elsdale Molson was killed serving as  second in command of HMS Rawalpindi when she was sunk by the German warships Scharnhorst and Gneisenau on 23 November 1939.

References

External links 
 

1863 births
1925 deaths
People educated at Cheltenham College
Alumni of Emmanuel College, Cambridge
Conservative Party (UK) MPs for English constituencies
UK MPs 1918–1922
UK MPs 1922–1923
Royal Army Medical Corps officers
British Army personnel of World War I
John
People from Goring-by-Sea